Cohetzala (municipality) is a town and municipality in Puebla in south-eastern Mexico.

Mayor Salvador Aguilar García died in an auto accident on January 28, 2018.

References

Municipalities of Puebla